Provincial Route 23, also known as RP23, is a highway that originates in National Route 40 in southwest Santa Cruz Province in Argentina. RP23 starts at RN40 to the southeast and ends at Del Desierto Lake in the northwest.

RP23 borders the north shore of Viedma Lake, this being the only access by land to the town of El Chaltén. To access Del Desierto Lake, the route enters Los Glaciares National Park bordering Río de las Vueltas.

References

Provincial roads in Santa Cruz Province, Argentina